Pablo Ignacio Calandria (born 15 March 1982) is an Argentine naturalized Chilean retired footballer who played as a striker.

Nicknamed Cracklandia, he spent most of his professional career in Spain and Chile, notably representing O'Higgins.

Club career

Early years / Spain
Born in Ituzaingó, Buenos Aires, Calandria played his first professional game for Club Atlético Huracán at the age of only 16. He was almost immediately linked with a transfer to country giants Club Atlético River Plate for a US$850,000 fee, but nothing came of it and was instead acquired by French side Olympique de Marseille.

Calandria was very unsuccessful in his first spells abroad, only scoring once in three full seasons combined with Marseille, RC Lens and Málaga CF. Released by L'OM in summer 2002 he continued playing in Spain in the following six years, representing four teams in Segunda División, mainly CD Leganés and Sporting de Gijón.

Return to Argentina
Calandria scored his first goal in the Argentine Primera División while playing for Gimnasia y Esgrima de Jujuy, in a 1–2 away defeat against San Lorenzo de Almagro for the 2008 Apertura tournament.

After being relegated he joined Atlético Tucumán, netting in his debut.

Chile
In 2010, Calandria signed for Santiago Morning in the Chilean Primera División, going on to remain in the country in the following years, with Club Deportivo Universidad Católica and Santiago Wanderers. In 2013 he won the Apertura with O'Higgins FC, scoring nine goals in 17 matches including a penalty against C.S.D. Rangers in the final minute that resulted in a 4–3 home win and qualified to the final against Club Deportivo Universidad Católica.

Calandria participated with the team in the 2014 edition of the Copa Libertadores. In the tournament, he scored through a penalty against Cerro Porteño but also missed one against Club Atlético Lanús in the last match, in an eventual group stage exit.

On 3 May 2014, whilst playing in the Supercopa de Chile against Deportes Iquique, Calandria suffered an anterior cruciate ligament injury to his knee, being sidelined for six months. He returned to action in January of the following year, against Unión La Calera.

International career
Calandria played for Argentina at under–17 and under–20 levels.

Style of play
Calandria stood out for his aerial ability, and was also a competent penalty taker.

Honours

Club
Universidad Católica
Copa Chile: 2011

O'Higgins
Primera División de Chile: 2013–14 Apertura
Supercopa de Chile: 2014

References

External links
 Argentine League statistics  
 
 
 

1982 births
Living people
Sportspeople from Buenos Aires Province
Argentine people of Italian descent
Italian sportspeople of Argentine descent
Citizens of Italy through descent
Argentine footballers
Association football forwards
Argentine Primera División players
Club Atlético Huracán footballers
Gimnasia y Esgrima de Jujuy footballers
Atlético Tucumán footballers
Ligue 1 players
Olympique de Marseille players
RC Lens players
La Liga players
Segunda División players
Málaga CF players
CD Leganés players
Sporting de Gijón players
Hércules CF players
Albacete Balompié players
Chilean Primera División players
Santiago Morning footballers
Club Deportivo Universidad Católica footballers
Santiago Wanderers footballers
O'Higgins F.C. footballers
Argentina under-20 international footballers
Argentine expatriate footballers
Expatriate footballers in France
Expatriate footballers in Spain
Expatriate footballers in Chile
Argentine expatriate sportspeople in France
Argentine expatriate sportspeople in Spain
Argentine expatriate sportspeople in Chile
Naturalized citizens of Chile